Fatty and Mabel's Simple Life is a 1915 American short comedy film directed by and starring Fatty Arbuckle.

Cast
 Roscoe 'Fatty' Arbuckle as Roscoe
 Mabel Normand as Mabel
 Al St. John as The Squire's son
 Josef Swickard as Mabel's father
 Joe Bordeaux as Farm hand
 Ted Edwards as Minister (uncredited)

See also
 Fatty Arbuckle filmography

References

External links
 
 
 

1915 films
Films directed by Roscoe Arbuckle
1915 comedy films
1915 short films
American silent short films
American black-and-white films
Silent American comedy films
Articles containing video clips
American comedy short films
1910s American films
1910s English-language films